Sinoboletus is a genus of fungi in the family Boletaceae.

Taxonomy
Chinese mycologist Mu Zang, who circumscribed the genus in 1992 with Sinoboletus duplicatoporus as the type species, has been a coauthor on every subsequent described species. The genus name refers to the affiliation with Boletus, and its Chinese distribution. Zang considered the genus to be similar to Boletus or Xerocomus, but suggested that the unique stratified pore arrangement precluded placement in either of these genera.

Description
Sinoboletus species produce caps that range in shape from hemispheric, to convex, to flattened. The cap surface is dry, with a tomentose texture. The flesh of the cap is either thin or thick. The golden yellow to yellow pore surface features crossveins that are arranged in two distinct layers. The pores, initially round, become angular or irregular in age. The club-shaped stipes have a dry surface, with striations at the top but no reticulations. Spores have an ovoid to ellipsoid shape.

Habitat and distribution
Sinoboletus species are suspected to be mycorrhizal with members of the families Fagaceae and Pinaceae, particularly Castanea calathiformis, and Castanea fleuryi.

Species
Sinoboletus albidus – M.Zang & R.H.Petersen 2004
Sinoboletus duplicatoporus – M.Zang 1992
Sinoboletus fuscus – M.Zang & C.M.Chen 1998
Sinoboletus gelatinosus – M.Zang & R.H.Petersen 2004
Sinoboletus guizhouensis – M.Zang & X.L.Wu 1995
Sinoboletus maekawae – M.Zang & R.H.Petersen 2001
Sinoboletus magniporus – M.Zang 1992
Sinoboletus magnisporus – M.Zang & C.M.Chen 1998
Sinoboletus meipengianus – M.Zang & D.Z.Zhang 2004
Sinoboletus tengii – M.Zang & Yan Liu 2002
Sinoboletus wangii – M.Zang, Zhu L.Yang & Y.Zhang 2006
Yunnan Province, altitude .

References

Boletaceae
Boletales genera